SpaceShipOne is an experimental air-launched rocket-powered aircraft with sub-orbital spaceflight capability at speeds of up to 3,000 ft/s (900 m/s, 3240 km/h), using a hybrid rocket motor. The design features a unique "feathering" atmospheric reentry system where the rear half of the wing and the twin tail booms folds 70 degrees upward along a hinge running the length of the wing; this increases drag while retaining stability. SpaceShipOne completed the first crewed private spaceflight in 2004. That same year, it won the US$10 million Ansari X Prize and was immediately retired from active service. Its mother ship was named "White Knight". Both craft were developed and flown by Mojave Aerospace Ventures, which was a joint venture between Paul Allen and Scaled Composites, Burt Rutan's aviation company. Allen provided the funding of approximately US$25 million.

Rutan has indicated that ideas about the project began as early as 1994 and the full-time development cycle time to the 2004 accomplishments was about three years. The vehicle first achieved supersonic flight on December 17, 2003, which was also the one-hundredth anniversary of the Wright Brothers' historic first powered flight. SpaceShipOne's first official spaceflight, known as flight 15P, was piloted by Mike Melvill. A few days before that flight, the Mojave Air and Space Port was the first commercial spaceport licensed in the United States. A few hours after that flight, Melvill became the first licensed U.S. commercial astronaut. The overall project name was "Tier One" which has evolved into Tier 1b with a goal of taking a successor ship's first passengers into space.

The achievements of SpaceShipOne are more comparable to those of the X-15 than to those of orbiting spacecraft like the Space Shuttle. Accelerating a spacecraft to orbital speed requires more than 60 times as much energy as accelerating it to Mach 3. It would also require an elaborate heat shield to safely dissipate that energy during re-entry.

SpaceShipOne's official model designation is Scaled Composites Model 316.

Design

Design goal
The Scaled Composites Model 316, known as SpaceShipOne, was a spaceplane designed to:
 Carry three humans (one of them a pilot) in a sea-level pressurized cabin.
 Reenter atmosphere and shed kinetic energy in an aerodynamically stable configuration.
 Glide transonically and subsonically.
 Land horizontally on a standard runway.

Vehicle description
The main structure is of a graphite/epoxy composite material. From front to back, it contains the crew cabin, oxidizer tank, fuel casing, and rocket nozzle. There are large vertical tailbooms mounted on the end of each wing, with horizontal stabilizers protruding from the tailbooms. It has gear for horizontal landings.

Originally the nozzle protruded from the back, but this turned out to be aerodynamically disadvantageous. In June 2004, between flights 14P and 15P, a fairing was added, smoothly extending the fuselage shape to meet the flared end of the nozzle. On flight 15P the new fairing overheated, due to being black on the inside and facing a hot, black nozzle. The fairing softened, and the lower part crumpled inwards during boost. Following that flight the interior of the fairing was painted white, and some small stiffening ribs were added.

The craft has a single unsteerable and unthrottleable hybrid rocket motor, a cold gas reaction control system, and aerodynamic control surfaces. All can be controlled manually. See the separate section below concerning the rocket engine.

The reaction control system is the only way to control spacecraft attitude outside the atmosphere. It consists of three sets of thrusters: there are thrusters at each wingtip to control roll, at the top and bottom of the nose to control pitch, and at the sides of the fuselage to control yaw. All thrusters have redundant backups, so there are twelve thrusters in all.

The aerodynamic control surfaces of SpaceShipOne are designed to operate in two distinct flight regimes, subsonic and supersonic. The supersonic flight regime is of primary interest during the boost phase of a flight, and the subsonic mode when gliding. There are separate upper and lower rudders, and elevons. These are controlled using aviation-style stick and pedals. In supersonic mode the trim tabs are controlled electrically, whereas the subsonic mode uses mechanical cable-and-rod linkage.

The wings of SpaceShipOne can be pneumatically tilted forwards into an aerodynamically stable high-drag "feathered" shape. This removes most of the need to actively control attitude during the early part of reentry: Scaled Composites refer to this as "care-free reentry". One of the early test flights actually performed re-entry inverted, demonstrating the flexibility and inherent stability of Burt Rutan's "shuttlecock" design. This feathered reentry mode is claimed to be inherently safer than the behavior at similar speeds of the Space Shuttle. The Shuttle undergoes enormous aerodynamic stresses and must be precisely steered in order to remain in a stable glide. (Although this is an interesting comparison of behavior, it is not an entirely fair comparison of design concepts: the Shuttle starts reentry at much higher speed than SpaceShipOne, and so has some very different requirements. SpaceShipOne is more similar to the X-15 vehicle.)

An early design called for a permanently shuttlecock-like shape, with a ring of feather-like stabilising fins. This would have made the spacecraft incapable of landing independently, requiring mid-air retrieval. This was deemed too risky, and the hybrid final design manages to incorporate the feathering capability into a craft that can land in a conventional manner. The tiltable rear sections of the wings and the tailbooms are collectively referred to as "the feather".

The landing gear consists of two widely separated main wheels and a nose skid. These are deployed using springs, assisted by gravity. Once deployed, they cannot be retracted inflight.

The spacecraft is incapable of independent takeoff from the ground. It requires a launch aircraft to carry it to launch altitude for an air launch.

The main ingredient of this material was accidentally leaked to Air and Space. If it flew with no thermal protection, the spacecraft would survive reentry but would be damaged.

There is an acknowledged "known deficiency" with the spacecraft's aerodynamic design that makes it susceptible to roll excursions. This has been seen on SpaceShipOne flight 15P where wind shear caused a large roll immediately after ignition, and SpaceShipOne flight 16P where circumstances not yet fully understood caused multiple rapid rolls. This flaw is not considered dangerous, but in both of these flights led to the achievement of a much lower altitude than expected. The details of the flaw are not public.

Cabin
The spacecraft cabin, designed to hold three humans, is shaped as a short cylinder, diameter , with a pointed forward end. The pilot sits towards the front, and two passengers can be seated behind.

The cabin is pressurized, maintaining a sea level breathable atmosphere. Oxygen is introduced to the cabin from a bottle, and carbon dioxide and water vapor are removed by absorbers. The occupants do not wear spacesuits or breathing masks, because the cabin has been designed to maintain pressure in the face of faults: all windows and seals are doubled.

The cabin has sixteen round double-pane windows, positioned to provide a view of the horizon at all stages of flight. The windows are small compared to the gaps between them, but there are sufficiently many for human occupants to patch together a moderately good view.

The nose section can be removed, and there is also a hatch below the rear windows on the left side. Crew ingress and egress is possible by either route.

Spaceplane navigation
The core of the spacecraft avionics is the System Navigation Unit (SNU). Together with the Flight Director Display (FDD), it comprises the Flight Navigation Unit. The unit was developed jointly by Fundamental Technology Systems and Scaled Composites.

The SNU is a GPS-based inertial navigation system, which processes spacecraft sensor data and subsystem health data. It downlinks telemetry data by radio to mission control.

The FDD displays data from the SNU on a color LCD. It has several distinct display modes for different phases of flight, including the boost phase, coast, reentry, and gliding. The FDD is particularly important to the pilot during the boost and coast phase in order to "turn the corner" and null rates caused by asymmetric thrust. A mix of commercial and bespoke software is used in the FDD.

Hybrid rocket engine
Tier One uses a hybrid rocket engine supplied by SpaceDev, with solid hydroxyl-terminated polybutadiene (HTPB, or rubber) fuel and liquid nitrous oxide oxidizer.

The physical layout of the engine is novel. The oxidizer tank is a primary structural component, and is the only part of the engine that is structurally connected to the spacecraft: the tank is in fact an integral part of the spacecraft fuselage. The fuel casing is a narrow cylinder cantilevered to the tank, pointing backwards. The cantilevered design means that a variety of motor sizes can be accommodated without changing the interface or other components. The nozzle is a simple extension of the fuel casing; the casing and nozzle are actually a single component, referred to as the CTN (case, throat, and nozzle). Burt Rutan has applied for a patent on this engine configuration.

There is considerable use of composite materials in the engine design. The oxidizer tank consists of a composite liner with graphite/epoxy over-wrap and titanium interface flanges. The CTN uses a high-temperature composite insulator with a graphite/epoxy structure. Incorporating the solid fuel (and hence the main part of the engine) and the ablative nozzle into this single bonded component minimizes the possible leak paths.

The oxidizer tank and CTN are bolted together at the main valve bulkhead, which is integrated into the tank. There are O-rings at the interface to prevent leakage; this is the main potential leak path in the engine. The ignition system, main control valve, and injector are mounted on the valve bulkhead, inside the tank. Slosh baffles are also mounted on this bulkhead. Because the oxidizer is stored under pressure, no pump is required.

The tank liner and the fuel casing are built in-house by Scaled Composites. The tank over-wrap is supplied by Thiokol. The ablative nozzle is supplied by AAE Aerospace. The oxidizer fill, vent, and dump system is supplied by Environmental Aeroscience Corporation. The remaining components—the ignition system, main control valve, injector, tank bulkheads, electronic controls, and solid fuel casting—are supplied by SpaceDev.

The CTN must be replaced between firings. This is the only part of the craft, other than the fuel and oxidizer themselves, that must be replaced.

The solid fuel is cast with four holes. This has the disadvantage that it is possible for chunks of fuel between the holes to become detached during a burn and obstruct the flow of oxidizer and exhaust. Such situations tend to rapidly self-correct.

The oxidizer tank is filled and vented through its forward bulkhead, on the opposite side of the tank from the fuel and the rest of the engine. This improves safety.

The nozzle has an expansion ratio of 25:1, which is optimized for the upper part of the atmosphere. A different nozzle, with an expansion ratio of 10:1, is used for test firing on the ground. The nozzles are black on the outside, but for aerodynamic testing, red dummy nozzles are used instead.

The rocket is not throttleable. Once lit, the burn can be aborted, but the power output cannot otherwise be controlled. The thrust in fact varies, for two reasons. Firstly, as the pressure in the oxidizer tank decreases, the flow rate reduces, reducing thrust. Secondly, in the late stages of a burn the oxidizer tank contains a mixture of liquid and gaseous oxidizer, and the power output of the engine varies greatly depending on whether it is using liquid or gaseous oxidizer at a particular moment. (The liquid, being far denser, allows a greater burn rate.)

Both the fuel and oxidizer can be stored without special precautions, and they do not burn when brought together without a significant source of heat. This makes the rocket far safer than conventional liquid or solid rockets. It is also relatively non-polluting: the combustion products are water vapor, carbon dioxide, hydrogen, nitrogen, and some carbon monoxide.

The engine was upgraded in September 2004, between flights 15P and 16P. The upgrade increased the oxidizer tank size, to provide greater thrust in the early part of the burn, allow a longer burn, and delay the onset of the variable thrust phase at the end of the burn. After the upgrade it was capable of  thrust and an  burn.

Launch aircraft

It has the same cabin, avionics, and trim system as SpaceShipOne. This means it can flight-qualify almost all components of SpaceShipOne. It also has a high thrust-to-weight ratio and large speed brakes. These features combined allow it to be used as a high-fidelity moving platform flight simulator for SpaceShipOne. White Knight is also equipped with a trim system which (when activated) causes it to have the same glide profile as SpaceShipOne; this allows the pilots to practice for landing SpaceShipOne. The same pilots fly White Knight as fly SpaceShipOne.

The rear wheels retract, but the front ones, which are steerable, are permanently deployed, with small fairings, referred to as "spats", in front. Another way to look at the overall shape is as two conventional planes, with very thin fuselages, side by side and joined at their wingtips, with the cockpit and engines mounted at the point of joining.

Although White Knight was developed for certain roles in the Tier One program, it is a very capable aircraft in its own right. Scaled Composites describe it as a "high-altitude research aircraft".

Flight profile
SpaceShipOne takes off from the ground, attached to White Knight in a parasite configuration, and under White Knight's power. The combination of SpaceShipOne and White Knight can take off, land, and fly under jet power to high altitude. A captive carry flight is one where the two craft land together without launching SpaceShipOne; this is one of the main abort modes available.

SpaceShipOne is then drop-released, and briefly glides unpowered. Rocket ignition may take place immediately, or may be delayed. If the rocket is never lit then SpaceShipOne can glide down to the ground. This is another major abort mode, in addition to being flown deliberately in glide tests.

The rocket engine is ignited while the spacecraft is gliding. Once under power, it is raised into a 65° climb, which is further steepened in the higher part of the trajectory. The maximum acceleration during ascent was recorded at 1.70G.

While at apogee the wings are reconfigured into high-drag mode. As the craft falls back it achieves high speeds comparable to those achieved on the way up; when it subsequently reenters the atmosphere it decelerates violently, up to 5.75G.

White Knight takes longer to descend, and typically lands a few minutes after SpaceShipOne.

Specifications

Development and winning the X Prize

SpaceShipOne was developed by Mojave Aerospace Ventures (a joint venture between Paul Allen and Scaled Composites, Burt Rutan's aviation company, in their Tier One program), without government funding. On June 21, 2004, it made the first privately funded human spaceflight. On October 4, it won the US$10 million Ansari X Prize, by reaching 100 kilometers in altitude twice in a two-week period with the equivalent of three people on board and with no more than ten percent of the non-fuel weight of the spacecraft replaced between flights. Development costs were estimated to be , funded completely by Paul Allen.

During its test program, SpaceShipOne set a number of important "firsts", including first privately funded aircraft to exceed Mach 2 and Mach 3, first privately funded crewed spacecraft to exceed 100km altitude, and first privately funded reusable crewed spacecraft.

SpaceShipOne was registered with the FAA as  N is the prefix for US-registered aircraft; 328KF was chosen by Scaled Composites to stand for 328 kilofeet (about 100 kilometers), the officially designated edge of space. The original choice of registry number, was already taken. N328KF is registered as a glider, reflecting the fact that most of its independent flight is unpowered.

SpaceShipOne's first flight, 01C, was an uncrewed captive flight test on May 20, 2003. Glide tests followed, starting with flight 03G on August 7, 2003. Its first powered flight, flight 11P, was made on December 17, 2003, the 100th anniversary of the first powered flight.

On April 1, 2004, Scaled Composites received the first license for suborbital rocket flights to be issued by the US Office of Commercial Space Transportation. This license permitted the company to conduct powered test flights over the course of one year. On June 17, 2004, under the leadership of airport CEO Stuart O. Witt, Mojave Airport reclassified itself as the Mojave Air and Space Port.

Flight 15P on June 21, 2004, was SpaceShipOne's first spaceflight, and the first privately funded human spaceflight. There were a few control problems, but these were resolved prior to the Ansari X PRIZE flights that followed, with flight 17P to 112 km on October 4, 2004, winning the prize.

The SpaceShipOne Team was awarded the Space Achievement Award by the Space Foundation in 2005.

Flights

On 17 December 2003—on the 100th anniversary of the Wright brothers first powered flight of an aircraft—SpaceShipOne, piloted by Brian Binnie on Flight 11P, made its first rocket-powered flight and became the first privately built craft to achieve supersonic flight.

All of the flights of SpaceShipOne were from the Mojave Airport Civilian Flight Test Center. Flights were numbered, starting with flight 01 on May 20, 2003. One or two letters are appended to the number to indicate the type of mission. An appended C indicates that the flight was a captive carry, G indicates an unpowered glide, and P indicates a powered flight. If the actual flight differs in category from the intended flight, two letters are appended: the first indicating the intended mission and the second the mission actually performed.

The flights were accompanied by two chase planes—an Extra 300 owned and flown by Chuck Coleman, and a Beechcraft Starship.

Astronauts
The SpaceShipOne pilots came from a variety of aerospace backgrounds. Mike Melvill is a test pilot, Brian Binnie is a former Navy pilot, and Peter Siebold is an engineer at Scaled Composites. They qualified to fly SpaceShipOne by training on the Tier One flight simulator and in White Knight and other Scaled Composites aircraft.

Retirement

SpaceShipOne's spaceflights were watched by large crowds at Mojave Spaceport. A fourth suborbital flight, Flight 18P, was originally scheduled for October 13, 2004. However, Burt Rutan decided not to risk damage to the historic craft, and cancelled it and all future flights.

On July 25, 2005, SpaceShipOne was taken to the Oshkosh Airshow in Oshkosh, Wisconsin. After the airshow, Mike Melvill and crew flew the White Knight, carrying SpaceShipOne, to Wright-Patterson Air Force Base in Dayton, Ohio, where Melvill spoke to a group of about 300 military and civilian personnel. Later in the evening, Melvill gave a presentation at the Dayton Engineers Club, entitled "Some Experiments in Space Flight", in honor of Wilbur Wright's now-famous presentation to the American Society of Mechanical Engineers in 1901 entitled "Some Experiments in Flight." The White Knight then transported SpaceShipOne to the Smithsonian Institution's National Air and Space Museum to be put on display. It was unveiled on Wednesday October 5, 2005 in the Milestones of Flight gallery and is now on display to the public in the main atrium with the Spirit of St. Louis, the Bell X-1, and the Apollo 11 command module Columbia.

Commander Brian Binnie donated the flight suit and checklist used during his Ansari X Prize-winning flight to an auction benefitting Seattle's Museum of Flight. Entertainer and fundraising auctioneer Fred Northup Jr. purchased the flight suit and checklist book, and the flight suit is on display at the museum's Charles Simonyi Space Gallery.

A piece of SpaceShipOne's carbon fiber material was launched aboard the New Horizons mission to Pluto in 2006.

Replicas

A year after its appearance in the Oshkosh Airventure airshow, the Experimental Aircraft Association featured a full-scale replica of the spacecraft in a wing of its museum which housed other creations of Burt Rutan. Using the same fiberglass molds as the original, it was so exact in its replication—despite not having any doors or interior—that it was dubbed "Serial 2 Scaled" by Scaled Composites. Each detail in its appearance was matched, down to the N328KF registration number on its fuselage. It is so precise that, during a 7-minute video presentation held every hour on the half hour in the museum, it can display the two different modes of its 'feathering' ability, albeit through the aid of pulleys and wires (there is no machinery in the replica).

Other full-scale replicas are at the William Thomas Terminal at Meadows Field Airport in Bakersfield the Mojave Spaceport's Legacy Park alongside the original Roton Atmospheric Test Vehicle, the Flying Heritage Collection at Paine Field in Everett, and Google's Mountain View Campus.

SpaceShipOne was also made into a model rocket in 2004.

Subsequent spacecraft
With the success of Tier One meeting its project goals, a successor project started in 2004 was Tier 1b. The successor ships are named SpaceShipTwo and White Knight Two. The name of the joint venture between Virgin Group and Scaled Composites is called The Spaceship Company, with a goal of carrying passengers under the name Virgin Galactic, a spaceliner with an initial target of a commercial fleet of five spacecraft.

In August 2005, Virgin Galactic stated that if the upcoming suborbital service with SpaceShipTwo is successful, the follow-up will be known as SpaceShipThree.

Gallery

See also 

 2004 in spaceflight
 Black Sky: The Race For Space, 2005 documentary about SpaceShipOne
 X-15
 SpaceShipTwo
 FAST20XX ALPHA vehicle based on SpaceShipOne

References 

 SpaceShipOne: An Illustrated History by Dan Linehan, foreword by Arthur C. Clarke (Zenith Press, 2008). .

External links

 Footage of SpaceShipOne landing and press conference with pilot Mike Melvill

 
Crewed spacecraft
Individual rockets
Individual spaceplanes
Private spaceflight
Reusable launch systems
Rocket-powered aircraft
Rutan aircraft
Experimental vehicles
Scaled Composites Tier One program
2000s United States experimental aircraft
Individual aircraft in the collection of the Smithsonian Institution
Individual spacecraft in the collection of the Smithsonian Institution
Suborbital spaceflight
Scaled Composites
Vehicles introduced in 2003
Aircraft first flown in 2003
Spaceplanes
American spacecraft